Sitronics is a microelectronics company based in Moscow, Russia and controlled by Sistema holding, that also manufactures mobile phones. Its main assets are the electronics fabs, research and development facilities NIIME and Mikron in Zelenograd, and other facilities elsewhere in Eastern Europe.

Despite losses in 2007, the company is planning to remain a part of Sistema and to expand its product portfolio, bidding for large telecommunications contracts such as a $1 billion deal to build a network in Saudi Arabia.

History
Sitronics was founded in 1997 in Zelenograd and was initially named "Scientific Center". The company became a fully vertically integrated company by 2000 and was organized into three business streams: Telecom Solutions, Information Technologies, and Microelectronic Solutions. The first focused on the development and manufacture of software and hardware for fixed and mobile communications operators and corporations in the communications services sector while the second handled consulting, enterprise management systems, system integration, distribution, training, and after-sales services, among others. The third stream specialized in the design, manufacture and sale of microelectronic products such as computer chips and smart cards. Mikron - a division of this third unit - is focused on the development of its RFID labels and is reported in 2013 as Russia's largest producer of this technology, with a capacity of 50 million tags monthly.

In January 2005 its headquarters was moved to Moscow and in November 2005 the company got its current name. It began an aggressive internationalization strategy, which is based on partnerships with regional and global players such as Cisco Systems, STMicroelectronics, Infineon, Giesecke+Devrient, Siemens, Motorola, Oracle, Intel, Sun Microsystems, and Microsoft, among others. On February 7, 2007 the company placed an IPO on the London Stock Exchange. Through a series of acquisitions it has become a leading Russian microelectronics company with revenues exceeding $1 billion in the first 9 months of 2007. The company delisted from the London Stock Exchange in 2012.

In August 2021 Sitronics Group bought 71.06% of Sputnix space-tech company.

Telecommunications
The company will produce nano-SIM cards on orders from one of Russia's big three mobile phone operators to be used in new Apple iPhones. The first batch will comprise about 50,000 cards that will be used in iPhone 5 gadgets.

Sitronics also makes an array of mobile phones. For instance, in 2010, it launched the first smartphone that featured the GLONASS technology, particularly the 90 nm GPS-GLONASS chip. One of the important ventures of Sitronics overseas was it association with ZTE Corporation, holding 51 percent to the latter's 49 percent in a joint-venture that aimed to enable the company to migrate its mass manufacturing and production capacity from Europe to Southeast Asia.

See also
 Sistema
 Intracom

References

External links

Regrowth of Russian electronics

Mobile phone companies of Russia
Electronics companies of Russia
Semiconductor companies of Russia
Electronics companies established in 1997
Russian brands
Manufacturing companies based in Moscow
RTI Systems
Companies formerly listed on the Moscow Exchange
Sistema